The Kadakkarapally Boat is a shipwreck found near Kadakkarappally, in the Southern India state of Kerala.

The vessel was found in a coconut grove in southern India by farmers in 1990. In 2002, archaeologists were notified of its existence, and the wreck was excavated in 2003.

Dating the wreck 
Radiocarbon dating done in the United States yielded a date of AD 1020 to 1270, corroborating the C-14 date of AD 920 to 1160 derived by an Indian laboratory. With no associated artifacts that could have been used for comparative dating, the overlap in the radiocarbon dates, that is 1020 to 1160, should be regarded as the likely date of the vessel.

Hull 
The vessel is a flat-bottomed boat with a hard chine, pointed bow and a similar stern. The planking is in two layers held together with iron nails and chunnam. Large floors set in recesses carved into the bottom help give the craft some internal strength, but these are set far apart and probably are only secondary to the ship. Deck beams dovetailed into the vessel's chine strake help hold the side of the ship.

Furthermore, channels and cleats throughout the hull are for transverse lashing, as seen in the presence of rope remains in them as well as in their alignment. This feature has only been found previously on Pharaonic Egyptian boats, such as the Khufu ship dating to the early third millennium B.C. No cultural connection is implied between Egypt and the Kadakkarapally Boat. Some have suggested the cleats and channels are part of a lashed-lug compression system as found in the Western Pacific and some areas of Southeastern Asia. This is not the case here, however, as the hull form is wrong (lashed-lug requires a hull curved in cross-section), and there are no wear marks indicative of such a compression system.

Bulkheads made of panels were set into the tops of the floors to divide the hull into compartments. These were not watertight, as centrally placed limber holes run through the floor for the drainage of the bilge. While the presence of bulkheads invites comparisons with Chinese ships, the ones on the Kadakkarapally Boat are different in that Chinese bulkheads are watertight and thus serve a somewhat different function.

References 

Pedersen, Ralph K. (Summer 2004). "The Shipwreck in the Coconut Grove: The Kaddakarapally Boat". The INA Quarterly 31(2). Institute of Nautical Archaeology. Archived from the original on 11 July 2007. Also hosted online at wedigboats.
Pinkowski, Jennifer (January/February 2004). "A Puzzling Wreck". Archaeology 57(1). Archaeological Institute of America.

Archaeology of shipwrecks
Ancient boats
Shipwrecks in the Indian Ocean
2003 in India
History of Kerala